Fountain Township may refer to:

Fountain Township, Ottawa County, Kansas, in Ottawa County, Kansas
Fountain Township, Fillmore County, Minnesota 
Fountain Township, Pitt County, North Carolina, in Pitt County, North Carolina
Fountain Township, Edmunds County, South Dakota, in Edmunds County, South Dakota

Township name disambiguation pages